This is a provisional list of formations of the Turkish Army as of 2008. It needs further authoritative corroboration.

A formation is a military organization that includes a mixture of its own ('organic') and operationally attached sub-units, and is usually combat-capable.

First Army
First Army is based in Selimiye Barracks, Istanbul

2nd Corps
2nd Corps has its headquarters at Gelibolu, Çanakkale/Edirne
4th Mechanized Infantry Bde (Keşan, Edirne)
18th Mechanized Infantry Bde (Ortaköy, Çanakkale)
54th Mechanized Infantry Bde (Edirne)
55th Mechanized Infantry Bde (Suloğlu, Edirne)
65th Mechanized Infantry Bde (Lüleburgaz, Kirklareli)
102nd Artillery Regiment (Keşan, Edirne)

3rd Corps
3rd Corps is based in Şişli/ Istanbul (NATO Rapid Deployable Corps – Turkey, responsible to SACEUR)
52nd Tactical Armored Division (Hadımkoy)
1st Armored Bde (Hadımkoy/ Istanbul)
2nd Armored Bde (Kartal/Istanbul)
66th Motorized Infantry Bde (Hasdal/Istanbul)

5th Corps
5th Corps is based in Çorlu/ Tekirdağ
3rd Armored Bde (Çerkezköy/ Tekirdağ)
95th Armored Bde (Malkara/Tekirdağ)
8th Mechanized Infantry Bde (Tekirdağ)
105th Artillery Regiment

Second Army
Second Army is based in Malatya

6th Corps
6th Corps is based in Adana
5th Armored Bde (Gaziantep)
39th Mech.Inf.Bde (İskenderun/Hatay)
106th Artillery Regiment

7th Corps
7th Corps is based in Diyarbakır
3rd Таctical Infantry Divisional HQ (Yüksekova/Hakkari)
10th Motorized Infantry Bde (Tatvan/Bitlis)
16th Mech.Inf.Bde (Bilgekışla/ Diyarbakır)
70th Mechanized Infantry Bde (Kızıltepe/Mardin)
6th Motorized Infantry Bde (Akçay/Şırnak)
23rd Internal Security Bde (Silopi/ Sirnak)
107th Artillery Regiment
2nd SF Regt (Mardin)

8th Corps
8th Corps is based in Elazığ
20th Armored Bde (Şanlıurfa)
172nd Armored Bde (Kahramanmaraş; appears to have moved in mid-2008 to Silopi)
108th Artillery Regiment

1st Commando Bde 
1st Commando Brigade is based in (Kayseri) (besides that unit also an air force Para-Bde in Kayseri).

3rd Commando Bde
Based in (Siirt)

Hakkari Mountain and Commando Bde
Hakkari Mountain and Commando Bde is based in (Hakkari)

Third Army
Third Army is based in (Erzincan)

4th Corps
4th Corps is based in (Ankara)
28th Mech.Inf.Bde (Mamak/Ankara)
1st Motorized Infantry Bde (Sakarya)
58th Artillery Bde (Polatlı/Ankara)
Training Division/Armour School (Etimesgut/Ankara)

9th Corps
9th Corps is based in Erzurum.
4th Armored Bde (Palandöken/Erzurum)
1st Mechanized Infantry Bde (Doğubeyazıt/Ağrı)
12th Mechanized Infantry Bde (Ağrı)
14th Mechanized Infantry Bde (Кars)
25th Mechanized Infantry Bde (Ardahan)
2nd Motorized Infantry Bde (Rize)
9th Motorized Infantry Bde (Sarıkamış)
34th Internal Security Bde (Patnos/Ağrı)
48th Internal Security Bde (Trabzon)
49th Internal Security Bde (Bingöl)
51st Internal Security Bde (Hozat/Tunceli)
59th Training Artillery Bde (Erzincan)
109th Artillery Regt

2nd Commando Bde
Based in Bolu

4th Commando Bde
Based in Tunceli

Aegean Army
Based in Izmir

11th Special Forces Bde
Based in Denizli

7th Special Forces Bde
Based in Sakarya

2nd Special Force Jandarma Bde
Based in Bornova/İzmir

19th Motorized Infantry Bde
Based in Edremit/Balıkesir

1st Infantry Bde
Based in Manisa

57th Artillery Bde
Based in İzmir

Zıpkınlar Commando Regiment
Based in Muğla

Plus

3rd Amphibious Marines Brigade
Based in Foca

Cyprus Turkish Peace Force/11th Corps
14th Armored Brigade (Turkey) (Asya)
28th Mechanized Infantry Div (Gazimağusa)
39th Mechanized Infantry Div (Based in Güzelyurt)
Cyprus Special Forces Regiment

References 

Source http://www.defencetalk.com/forums/archive/index.php/t-5685.html
:tr:Türk Kara Kuvvetleri, accessed 7 July 2008
https://www.bulurum.com/details/map/1kac61b4ahc40id7cacj1g5_6i2g1a32 - 6th Infantry Division

Further reading 
Chapter 5, 'Turkish Armed Forces' in Umit Cizre (ed.), 'Democratic Oversight and Reform of the Security Sector in Turkey,' LIT/DCAF 2008, .

Army units and formations of Turkey
Turkish military-related lists